II Trill is the second studio album by UGK member Bun B. It was released on May 20, 2008 by Rap-a-Lot Records, Asylum Records and Warner Bros. Records.

The album is the follow-up to his successful debut album, Trill. It was mentioned that after the death of his lifelong friend and companion Pimp C, due in part to an accidental overdose, he is likely to "ban the syrup talk on his new CD." The album was originally set to be released on April 29, 2008 but was pushed back to May 20. The album features lyrics pertaining to political and social issues, as well as a tribute track to Pimp C.

Some of the featured artists on the album, including Sean Kingston, Pimp C, Young Buck, Lupe Fiasco, Lil Wayne, David Banner, Rick Ross, Glasses Malone,  Chamillionaire, Kam, Slim Thug, Webbie, Akon, Mike Jones, 8Ball & MJG, Z-Ro, Junior Reid and Juvenile. The lead single, "That's Gangsta" featuring Sean Kingston was released on May 20, 2008. The second single, "You're Everything" featuring Rick Ross, David Banner, 8Ball and MJG was released on July 31, 2008. Its B-side "Pop It 4 Pimp" has also received radio airplay.

II Trill debuted at number two on the US Billboard 200 chart, with 98,000 copies sold in the first week of release. The album also spent three weeks at the top of the US Rap album chart. The album has since sold 300,000 copies.

Track listing

Sample credits
 "You're Everything" samples "Cry for You" performed by Jodeci.
 "Pop It 4 Pimp" samples "Back That Azz Up" performed by Juvenile.
 "Underground Thang" samples "Steppin' Out" performed by Steel Pulse.
 "Angel in the Sky" samples "Ribbon in the Sky" performed by Stevie Wonder.

Charts

Weekly charts

Year-end charts

References

2008 albums
Bun B albums
Asylum Records albums
Rap-A-Lot Records albums
Albums produced by Cozmo
Albums produced by Scott Storch
Albums produced by Jazze Pha
Albums produced by J. R. Rotem
Albums produced by DJ Khalil
Sequel albums